The City of Prahran was a local government area about  southeast of Melbourne, the state capital of Victoria, Australia.

History

Prahran (/pɛ'ræn/) was incorporated as a municipal district on 24 April 1855, and became a borough on 1 October 1863, a town on 13 May 1870, and a city on 30 May 1879.

On 22 June 1994, the City of Prahran was abolished, and along with the City of Malvern, was merged into the newly created City of Stonnington. Parts of Windsor were transferred to the newly created City of Port Phillip.

Council meetings were held at the Prahran Town Hall, at Chapel Street and Greville Street, Prahran. It presently serves as a service centre for the City of Stonnington.

Mayors

Wards

The City of Prahran was subdivided into four wards on 2 December 1887, each electing three councillors:
 Prahran Ward
 South Yarra Ward
 Toorak Ward
 Windsor Ward

Suburbs
 Armadale (shared with the City of Malvern)
 Melbourne (Domain district)
 Prahran*
 South Yarra
 Toorak (shared with the City of Malvern)
 Windsor

* Council seat.

Population

* Estimate in the 1958 Victorian Year Book.

References

External links
 Victorian Places - Prahran

Prahran
1994 disestablishments in Australia
City of Stonnington
1855 establishments in Australia